Žaborić is a village in Šibenik Knin County. It is located on the Adriatic Sea by the D8 state road, between villages Grebaštica and Brodarica. The most prominent economic activity is tourism.

References

External links 
 Šibenik község hivatalos oldala 
 A žaborići Szent Anna templom blogja 
 A dalmáciai és isztriai ferences rendtartomány honlapja 
 Žaborić rövid ismertető 

Populated places in Šibenik-Knin County